Arthur Grossman is an American bassoonist and professor of music.

Arthur Grossman may also refer to:

Arthur R. Grossman (born 1950), American plant biologist
 Arthur Grossman, birth name of lyricist Arthur Freed